Epsilonpapillomavirus is a genus of viruses, in the family Papillomaviridae. Cattle serve as natural hosts and it is one of the bovine papillomaviruses. There are two species in this genus. Diseases associated with this genus include: fibropapillomas and true epithelial papillomas of the skin.

Taxonomy
The following two species are assigned to the genus:
 Epsilonpapillomavirus 1
 Epsilonpapillomavirus 2

Structure
Viruses in Epsilonpapillomavirus are non-enveloped, with icosahedral geometries, and T=7 symmetry. The diameter is around 60 nm. Genomes are circular, around 8kb in length. The genome codes for 6 proteins.

Life cycle
Viral replication is nuclear. Entry into the host cell is achieved by attachment of the viral proteins to host receptors, which mediates endocytosis. Replication follows the dsDNA bidirectional replication model. Dna templated transcription, with some alternative splicing mechanism is the method of transcription. The virus exits the host cell by nuclear envelope breakdown.
Bovine serve as the natural host. Transmission routes are contact.

References

External links

 ICTV Report Papillomaviridae
 Viralzone: Epsilonpapillomavirus

Papillomavirus
Virus genera